Carvers Bay High School is a public high school in Hemingway, South Carolina serving students from parts of Georgetown County, South Carolina, United States. It is in the Georgetown County School District and has grades 9 to 12 . The school was established from a merger between Choppee High School and Pleasant Hill High School, and opened in 2000. In 2000 it enrolled nearly 800 students.  It serves students from the towns of Pleasant Hill, Plantersville, Hemingway, Lanes Creek, Dunbar, Oatland, St. Luke, Pee Dee, Choppee and Browns Ferry.

Middle school
Carvers Bay Middle School is located on the same campus, in a separate building.

Timekeeping
There are no bells to mark the beginning or ending of class periods. Students and staff use watches and clocks.

Notable alumni
 Clifton Geathers - National Football League (NFL) player, Philadelphia Eagles.
 Kwame Geathers - NFL player, San Diego Chargers
 Robert Geathers - NFL player, Cincinnati Bengals

References

Public high schools in South Carolina
Schools in Georgetown County, South Carolina